The Ami and Amanda Oakley House at 219 E 400 N in Springville, Utah was built in 1895.  It was listed on the National Register of Historic Places (NRHP) in 1998.

It is built of fired brick, and, according to its NRHP nomination "is an excellent example of the high quality craftsmanship and design available in Springville near the turn of the [20th] century."

References

Houses on the National Register of Historic Places in Utah
Victorian architecture in Utah
Houses completed in 1895
Houses in Utah County, Utah
National Register of Historic Places in Utah County, Utah
Buildings and structures in Springville, Utah
Individually listed contributing properties to historic districts on the National Register in Utah